Elaphidion glabratum is a species of beetle in the family Cerambycidae. It was described by Johan Christian Fabricius in 1775.

References

glabratum
Beetles described in 1775
Taxa named by Johan Christian Fabricius